This is the list of the number-one albums of the Classical Artist Albums Chart during the 2000s.

Number ones

See also

List of UK Albums Chart number ones of the 2000s

Notes

References

External links
UK Classical Charts at the Official Charts Company

Classical Artist
2000s in British music
United Kingdom Classical Artist Albums